Goudi (since 2006; formerly Γουδί ) is a residential neighbourhood of Athens, Greece, on the eastern part of town and on the foothills of Mount Hymettus.

History
The name of the area derives from the 19th century Goudi (Γουδή) family, who owned a large estate in the area. It was home to a large army camp of the same name (where the Trial of the Six defendants were executed in 1922),  three university hospitals (Laiko and two children's hospitals) and the main campuses for the Faculty of Medicine and the Faculty of Dentistry, of the Athens University School of Health Sciences. The area's main square is St. Thomas' Square, with the church of St. Thomas in its middle. The Goudi army camp was decommissioned and turned into parkland and sports facilities, hosting the badminton and modern pentathlon venues for the 2004 Olympic Games.

During 2012, 'Goudi' became a catchcry during some political extremist rallies in Greece, with protesters chanting it to express their hostility to mainstream politicians who they perceived as traitors to the country during the Euro Crisis, alleging that they deserved a similar fate as the Trial of the Six defendants.

Dispute over correct name
The use of the name Γουδί, treated as if it were a neuter noun (rather than as a genitive of the surname Γουδή from which it derives) was widespread until translator Vasiliki Karagianni led a campaign to change to the correct use. Even during the years when the Goudi family were alive, popular opinion still led to its treating as a neuter noun, similar to other towns and cities whose name derived from surname such as Kapandriti, Tatoi and Galatsi.

Karagiannis' campaign was ultimately successful and the city council of Athens approved the form change without objection in 2006. This led to a change in certain road signs and bus line names.

References 

Neighbourhoods in Athens